Gonzalo Escobar and Manuel Sánchez were the defending champions but only Escobar chose to defend his title, partnering Luis David Martínez. Escobar lost in the first round to Adrián Menéndez Maceiras and Federico Zeballos.

Lucas Miedler and Sebastian Ofner won the title after defeating Matt Reid and John-Patrick Smith 4–6, 6–4, [10–6] in the final.

Seeds

Draw

References

External links
 Main draw

Torneo Internacional Challenger León - Doubles
2019 Doubles